Einar Nilsen (later Skar, 18 November 1901 – 29 March 1980) was a Norwegian boxer who competed in the 1920 Summer Olympics. He was born in Drammen and died in Lier.

In 1920 he was eliminated in the first round of the flyweight class after losing his fight to the upcoming gold medalist Frankie Genaro.

References

External links
 profile

1901 births
1980 deaths
Flyweight boxers
Olympic boxers of Norway
Boxers at the 1920 Summer Olympics
Norwegian male boxers
Sportspeople from Drammen
20th-century Norwegian people